Malitbog is the name of several places in the Philippines:

Malitbog, Bukidnon, a 2nd class municipality in the province of Bukidnon, Philippines
Malitbog, Southern Leyte, a 4th class municipality in the province of Southern Leyte, Philippines

See also
 Malitbog Geothermal Power Station